This is a list of the National Register of Historic Places listings in Willacy County, Texas.

This is intended to be a complete list of properties and districts listed on the National Register of Historic Places in Willacy County, Texas, United States.  The publicly disclosed locations of National Register properties and districts may be seen in a mapping service provided.

There are 4 properties and districts listed on the National Register in the county, including 1 National Historic Landmark.

Current listings

|}

See also

National Register of Historic Places listings in Texas
List of National Historic Landmarks in Texas
Recorded Texas Historic Landmarks in Willacy County

References

Willacy County, Texas
Willacy County